Tiit Vähi's second cabinet was in office in Estonia from 17 April 1995 to 6 November 1995, when it was succeeded by Tiit Vähi's third cabinet.

Members

This cabinet's members were the following:
 Tiit Vähi – Prime Minister
 Edgar Savisaar – Minister of Interior Affairs
 Riivo Sinijärv – Minister of Foreign Affairs
 Paul Varul – Minister of Justice
 Liina Tõnisson – Minister of Economic Affairs

References

Cabinets of Estonia